The 1992 Seattle Mariners season was their 16th since the franchise creation.

After a franchise-best 83 wins the previous season, the Mariners finished with nineteen fewer, the largest one-year decline in team history. Ownership changed in July, and first-year manager Bill Plummer was fired after the season, succeeded by Lou Piniella in November for 1993.

Lefthanded starter Randy Johnson won the first of four consecutive strikeout titles with 241. In his third full season in the majors, 29-year-old third baseman Edgar Martínez batted .343 to lead the majors and win the first of his two American League batting titles. He hit .388 in July and .395 in August and was the league's player of the month for both.

Offseason
 October 11, 1991: The Mariners decided not to bring back manager Jim Lefebvre, along with pitching coach Mike Paul for the 1992 season.
 October 29, 1991: Third base coach Bill Plummer was promoted to manager.
 December 11, 1991: Bill Swift, Mike Jackson, and Dave Burba were traded by the Mariners to the San Francisco Giants for Kevin Mitchell and Mike Remlinger.
 February 19, 1992: Shane Turner was signed as a free agent by the Mariners.
 March 9, 1992: John Moses was signed as a free agent by the Mariners.

Regular season

Season standings

Record vs. opponents

Notable transactions
 April 4: Mario Díaz was signed as a free agent by the Mariners.
 May 29: Mario Díaz was released by the Mariners.
 May 29: Bill Haselman was selected off waivers by the Mariners from the Texas Rangers.
 August 22: Sean Twitty (minors) was traded by the Mariners to the New York Yankees for Tim Leary and cash.

Roster

Player stats

Batting

Starters by position
Note: Pos = Position; G = Games played; AB = At bats; H = Hits; Avg. = Batting average; HR = Home runs; RBI = Runs batted in

Other batters
Note: G = Games played; AB = At bats; H = Hits; Avg. = Batting average; HR = Home runs; RBI = Runs batted in

Pitching

Starting pitchers 
Note: G = Games pitched; IP = Innings pitched; W = Wins; L = Losses; ERA = Earned run average; SO = Strikeouts

Other pitchers 
Note: G = Games pitched; IP = Innings pitched; W = Wins; L = Losses; ERA = Earned run average; SO = Strikeouts

 Relief pitchers Note: G = Games pitched; W = Wins; L = Losses; SV = Saves; ERA = Earned run average; SO = Strikeouts''

Awards and honors
 Randy Johnson, American League leader, Strikeouts
 Edgar Martínez, Major League leader, Batting average

Farm system

LEAGUE CHAMPIONS: Peninsula

References

External links
1992 Seattle Mariners at Baseball Reference
1992 Seattle Mariners team page at www.baseball-almanac.com

Seattle Mariners seasons
Seattle Mariners season
Seattle Marin